Guilty or Innocent: The Sam Sheppard Murder Case (1975) is a TV drama film, starring George Peppard and directed by Robert Michael Lewis. It was produced by Harold Gast and Harve Bennett.

Plot
The film traces the story of Sam Sheppard (George Peppard), an Ohio doctor wrongly accused of murdering his wife in 1954. As the film begins,  a dying Dr. Sam gasps “I know who killed Marilyn.”

Sheppard is a successful osteopath in Cleveland working at the family clinic. He has an attractive wife Marilyn and a nine-year-old son. His idyllic life comes to an end one July morning when the police are called to his home after he reports an intruder attacked him and murdered his wife.

The case and the ensuing trial get nationwide publicity. Despite an able defense lawyer, Sam is convicted and sentenced to life imprisonment, never ceasing to proclaim his innocence. He is released after ten years through the efforts of his brilliant new young lawyer F. Lee Bailey and given a retrial. Bailey's aggressive defense overwhelms the prosecution and Sheppard is found not guilty at last; however, his life afterwards is not happy.

He remarries soon after getting out of prison but it ends in divorce and he is sued for malpractice after regaining his medical license. Desperate to make a living he becomes a small time professional wrestler. The strain of his never-ending ordeal wears on him and he turns to alcohol. He dies a broken man at 46 of a liver disease.

As the film ends, a narrator notes that the murderer has never been found and that “the rest is mystery.”

Cast

Reception 
The New York Times commented that the aspects of the Sam Sheppard murder case were "misinterpreted or botched," and criticized the production for "shabby and sordid sensationalism."

References 
Hollywood and American history: a filmography of over 250 motion pictures depicting U.S. history, by Michael R. Pitts

Notes

External links
 

1975 films
1975 television films
NBC network original films
Films scored by Lalo Schifrin
Drama films based on actual events
Films produced by Harve Bennett
Films set in Ohio
Films directed by Robert Michael Lewis